Anadara secernenda, also known as baughman ark or skewed arkis is a saltwater clam in the family Arcidae, which includes the ark shells. This species is found in the Caribbean Sea and off the shores of Brazil. It was discovered in 1851.

Description

Distribution and habitat

References

secernenda
Bivalves described in 1907